Jews who were married to non-Jews had a greater chance of surviving the Holocaust. In Germany, Jews in "privileged mixed marriages" were exempt from some anti-Jewish laws. All intermarried Jews in Greater Germany were generally exempted from deportation during the Holocaust until early 1945, which enabled 90 percent to survive. However, they faced strong pressure from Nazi authorities to divorce, which would end the protection for the Jewish partner. A famous event is the 1943 Rosenstrasse protest, in which non-Jewish women protested in Berlin after their Jewish husbands were arrested. It is unclear whether this action prevented the deportation of their husbands.

Effects

Ban on intermarriage

The 1935 Nuremberg Laws banned marriage between Jews and those of "German blood". Existing marriages were not dissolved. In the Protectorate of Bohemia and Moravia, marriages between Jews and Germans were banned upon the German invasion in March 1939, but it was possible for Jews and ethnic Czechs to marry until March 1942.

Exemptions
In Germany, marriages between a Jewish woman and a "German-blooded" man in which children were raised without Jewish faith were considered "privileged mixed marriages". Jewish women in such marriages received better rations than other Jews, and were exempted from a variety of Nazi decrees. Even "non-privileged mixed marriages" brought important privileges, such as the Jewish partner's right not to be deported.

In the Netherlands, all intermarried couples were exempt from deportation until September 1942, at which point Jewish men without children were no longer exempt. The families had to register with the authorities to receive the exemption. In the Slovak State and the Independent State of Croatia, intermarried Jews were mostly exempt from deportation. Even if exemptions from deportation did not exist, Jews in mixed marriages often received help from non-Jewish relatives enabling them to hide and survive.

Other forms of persecution
Instead of being deported, many intermarried Jews in greater Germany were instead drafted into forced labor battalions with Organization Todt. During the 1943 Fabrikaktion, many intermarried German Jews were arrested. None of them were deported; some historians have argued that this outcome was the result of the Rosenstrasse protest.  In 1943, those Jews whose marriages had ended were ordered to be deported by the Gestapo; as a result, in January 1944, some 1,000 Jews were deported to Theresienstadt Ghetto. Most of them perished after being transported to Auschwitz concentration camp. In January 1945, the exemption from deportation was revoked and many intermarried Jews were deported to Theresienstadt Ghetto. However, most of them survived the war.

In some cases, the Gestapo would arrest intermarried Jews or their non-Jewish spouses on fabricated charges, often as a pretext to steal their property.

Pressure to divorce
Intermarried families faced strong pressure to divorce, especially those in which the non-Jewish partner was female. The non-Jewish partner often faced loss of a job or property due to Aryanization. From the fall of 1944, many non-Jewish partners in mixed marriages were drafted for forced labor. In the Protectorate of Bohemia and Moravia, some Czech men married to Jewish women were sent to a forced labor camp and promised release if they agreed to divorce. In Greater Germany, the divorce rate has been estimated by historians between 7 and 10 percent.

Statistics
In Amsterdam, intermarried Jews had a 59% lower risk of dying than those who were not intermarried. By September 1944, 98 percent of surviving German and Austrian Jews were in mixed marriages, according to official statistics. More than 90 percent of intermarried Jews from Greater Germany survived the war. Benjamin Frommer estimates that most intermarried Jews in Bohemia and Moravia survived the Nazi occupation, if they were not divorced or widowed.

Aftermath
In the aftermath of the Holocaust, intermarried families contended with the attitudes of other Jews and Jewish organizations that disapproved of intermarriage.

References

Further reading

Exogamy
The Holocaust
Marriage in Judaism